Kononowicz is a surname. Notable people with the surname include:

 Krzysztof Kononowicz (born 1963), Polish social activist
 Maciej Kononowicz (born 1988), Polish footballer 

Polish-language surnames